Chen Pao-pei is a former table tennis player from Taiwan. She won several medals in singles, doubles, and team events in the Asian Table Tennis Championships in 1953 and 1957.

References

1934 births
1975 deaths
Taiwanese female table tennis players
Asian Games medalists in table tennis
Table tennis players at the 1958 Asian Games
Asian Games bronze medalists for Chinese Taipei
Medalists at the 1958 Asian Games
20th-century Taiwanese women